The Battle of Bregalnica was fought between the Kingdom of Bulgaria army and the Kingdom of Serbia during the Second Balkan War. It was the largest battle of the war.

Gallery

References

Sources
 Savo Skoko Vojvoda Radomir Putnik Vol.1; Beogradsko Grafičko-Izdavčki Zavod, 1984.

Notes 
 The numbers of the strength of Serbian Army do not indicate the exact strength of the forces deployed during the Battle of Bregalnica but rather the entire strength of the Serbian Army in Macedonia (the Operational group South, which included the combined 1st and 3rd Armies) at the beginning of hostilities.

Battles of the Second Balkan War
Battles involving Bulgaria
Battles involving Serbia
Military history of North Macedonia
Conflicts in 1913
1913 in Bulgaria
1913 in Serbia
Vardar Macedonia (1912–1918)
June 1913 events
July 1913 events